U.S. Route 30 (US 30) is an east–west arterial surface road in northern Illinois. It runs from across the Mississippi River from Clinton, Iowa, to Lynwood at the Indiana state line.

Route description

Mississippi River to Interstate 39 
US 30 crosses from Clinton, Iowa, to the greater Fulton area over the Gateway Bridge. US 30 bypasses most of the city of Fulton to the south. From Fulton, US 30 travels southeastward through the town of Morrison en route to a crossing over the Rock River and Rock Falls. Here also, US 30 bypasses the majority of the town, intersecting Illinois Route 40 (IL 40) and having an interchange with Interstate 88 (I-88) on the southeast side of Rock Falls.

East of Rock Falls, US 30 turns directly eastwards and intersects IL 26 well south of Dixon. It also intersects US 52 at a remote location north of Amboy in Lee County. US 30 remains rural continuing eastwards, intersecting IL 251 a few miles west of I-39.

On the stretch of US 30 between Rock Falls and Shabbona, there are no notable population centers located on the highway.

Interstate 39 to Joliet 
US 30 continues east of the I-39 interchange on a largely straight line through the towns of Shabbona, Waterman and Hinckley. The proposed Prairie Parkway limited access highway would have intersected US 30 east of Dauberman Road in the village of Big Rock, between Hinckley and Sugar Grove. In Sugar Grove at IL 47, the character of the road changes relatively quickly.

Near the Aurora Municipal Airport in Sugar Grove, US 30 has an interchange with the western terminus of IL 56 and IL 47. US 30 exits south with IL 47 and remains concurrent for a couple of miles; US 30 then turns east at the Kendall–Kane county line. US 30 then intersects IL 31, the Fox River and crosses over IL 25 in Montgomery but does not provide access to IL 25; east of Montgomery, US 30 overlaps US 34 for a short distance, and then turns south-southeast to Plainfield, picking up the Lincoln Highway designation. Prior to the route being redrawn to follow the path of US 34, the route actually exited off of US 34 through a highway interchange. The interchange in Aurora at Hill Avenue, where Lincoln Highway passes through Aurora toward the south is where the route gains the designation, and is where the old interchange was located as Hill Avenue passed over US 34 and continued south toward Plainfield.

US 30 passes a mile to the north of downtown Plainfield on 143rd Street, then turns south onto IL 59 (Division Street) for approximately one mile. Southeast of downtown, US 30 leaves IL 59 and heads southeast toward Joliet.

US 30 intersects I-55 at a busy commercial center near the Louis Joliet Mall in the far northwest corner of Joliet. A major construction project, begun in 2006, is in process to widen the remaining two-lane sections in this area to four lanes. A similar project was completed on other sections in far western Joliet and Crest Hill during the few years before.

US 30 intersects an east–west segment of IL 7 (Theodore Street) as it runs through the major commercial district of Crest Hill. It then continues southeast into the central part of the city of Joliet.

Joliet to Indiana state line 
Within Joliet, US 30 runs on Plainfield Road, then Center Street, where it splits onto Jefferson Street eastbound and Western Avenue/Cass Street westbound, concurrent with US 6 east of the Des Plaines River. The US 6/US 30 combination eastbound begins at Scott Street and ends at Collins Street; westbound it starts at Collins and ends at Ottawa Street. There are also intersections at Scott Street and Ottawa Street with IL 53, which runs north–south through downtown Joliet. US 30 continues eastbound on Cass Street.

At I-80, US 30 is once again called the Lincoln Highway, running through the southern suburbs of New Lenox, Frankfort, Matteson, Chicago Heights, Ford Heights and Lynwood. It intersects US 45 (La Grange Road) and the southern terminus of IL 43 in Frankfort, I-57 in Matteson, IL 1 (Halsted Street) in Chicago Heights, IL 394 near Sauk Village and the southern terminus of IL 83 in Lynwood.

West of I-80, US 30 generally has two lanes plus a center turn lane; east of I-80, the width of the road fluctuates between four and six lanes and is occasionally divided by a median. A 2003–2004 reconstruction project widened US 30 to four lanes between IL 394 and the Indiana state line. The point west of I-80 where US 30 widens to four lanes is the beginning of a very long stretch of road where US 30 stays at least four lanes; going eastward, US 30 does not narrow to two lanes again until just east of Canton, Ohio.

History 
US 30 in Illinois has undergone many major changes since its inception in 1926. It originally ran from Fulton (on the modern-day Lyons-Fulton Bridge) through Chicago using current US 30, IL 2 east of Sterling to Dixon and IL 38 from Dixon to Westchester (the full length of Il 38). It then followed Roosevelt Road, various city streets, Stony Island Avenue and Torrence Avenue to reach Indiana.

In 1932, US 30 was relocated onto the Lincoln Highway in the southern suburbs, from Torrence Avenue to IL 31 in the Fox River Valley. US 30 then concurrent with current IL 31 (then called US 430) north to IL 38 in Geneva, and kept the 1926 routing westward from Geneva. The old US 30 through Chicago became US 330. In the Fox River Valley, US 430 was created and ran north to Richmond from Geneva.

Between 1932 and 1942, US 30 was relocated west of Geneva to Sterling on a new, more direct road further south. U 330 was extended westward as US 30 was relocated south. In 1937, US 430 was dropped in favor of IL 31.

In 1942, US 330 was dropped entirely and became Alternate U.S. Route 30, which lasted until 1971.

In June 1956, the Gateway Bridge opened south of the Lyons-Fulton Bridge. U.S. 30 was rerouted south onto this bridge, and the old route named another Alternate U.S. Route 30—this was soon changed to IL 136 so as to match Iowa 136 on the other side of the Mississippi River.

In 1959, US 30 was rerouted around Aurora. The old route through Aurora (present-day Galena Boulevard, New York Street and Hill Avenue) became City U.S. Route 30; this lasted all of one year until 1960 when it was renamed Business U.S. Route 30. Business US 30 lasted a little longer before being removed in 1970.

In 1963, the East-West Tollway was built. From 1963 to 1965, the tollway was marked as Toll U.S. Route 30 and ran along modern-day I-88, I-294, and the present-day IL 394 (which in 1963 was called IL 1 until 1964, when it became IL 394). The east–west Tollway portion was renamed to IL  in 1965, and eventually became IL 5 before becoming I-88 in 1988.

In 1971, Alternate U.S. Route 30 in Illinois was discontinued, renamed as IL 38 west of Westchester, and dropped through the city of Chicago.

Since a 2008 realignment, US 30 passes a mile to the north of downtown Plainfield on 143rd Street, then turns south onto IL 59 (Division Street) for approximately one mile. Southeast of downtown, US 30 leaves IL 59 and heads southeast toward Joliet. Prior to 2008, US 30 ran directly through downtown Plainfield on Lockport Street, briefly sharing alignment with IL 126, before joining IL 59 for three blocks.

Major intersections

References

External links

 Illinois
U.S. Route 030 in Illinois
30
Transportation in Whiteside County, Illinois
Transportation in Lee County, Illinois
Transportation in DeKalb County, Illinois
Transportation in Kane County, Illinois
Transportation in Kendall County, Illinois
Transportation in Will County, Illinois
Transportation in Cook County, Illinois